Krasnaya Gorka is a rural locality (a settlement) in Pinezhskoye Rural Settlement of Pinezhsky District, Arkhangelsk Oblast, Russia. The population was 30 as of 2010.

Geography 
Krasnaya Gorka is located 149 km northwest of Karpogory (the district's administrative centre) by road. Maletino is the nearest rural locality.

References 

Rural localities in Pinezhsky District